Carbonyl fluoride is a chemical compound with the formula COF2. It is a carbon oxohalide. This gas, like its analog phosgene, is colourless and highly toxic. The molecule is planar with C2v symmetry, bond lengths of 1.174 Å (C=O) and 1.312 Å (C–F), and an F–C–F bond angle of 108.0°.

Preparation and properties
Carbonyl fluoride is usually produced as a decomposition product of fluorinated hydrocarbons in the thermal decomposition thereof, for example from trifluoromethanol or tetrafluoromethane in the presence of water:

 +  →  + 2 

Carbonyl fluoride can also be prepared by reaction of phosgene with hydrogen fluoride and the oxidation of carbon monoxide, although the latter tends to result in over-oxidation to carbon tetrafluoride. The oxidation of carbon monoxide with silver difluoride is convenient:

 + 2  →  + 2 

Carbonyl fluoride is unstable in the presence of water, hydrolyzing to carbon dioxide and hydrogen fluoride:

 +   →  + 2

Safety
Carbonyl fluoride is toxic with a recommended exposure limit of 2 ppm as an 8-hour time weighted average and a 5 ppm as a short-term (15-minute average) exposure.

References

Carbonyl compounds
Fluorine compounds
Nonmetal halides
Carbon oxohalides